USS Lagoda (SP-3250) was a United States Navy patrol vessel in commission from 1918 to 1919.

Lagoda was built as the private motorboat Mosquetaire in 1906 by the New York Yacht, Launch & Engine Company at Morris Heights in the Bronx, New York. She later was renamed successively Jessica, Lady Arden, Scotian, and Lagoda.

On 20 September 1918, the U.S. Navy acquired Lagoda from her owner, N. W. Tilton of New York City, for use as a section patrol boat during World War I. She was commissioned as USS Lagoda (SP-3250) on 17 November 1918 - six days after the end of the war.

Assigned to the 3rd Naval District and based at the Staten Island Quarantine Station on Staten Island, New York, Lagoda was used by the District Commissioner, Naval Overseas Transportation Service, in New York Harbor.

Lagoda was decommissioned on 15 August 1919 and sold to Robert J. Bourke of Washington, D.C., on 30 October 1919. Bourke took delivery of her from the Navy on 20 November 1919.

References

SP-3250 Lagoda at Department of the Navy Naval History and Heritage Command Online Library of Selected Images: U.S. Navy Ships -- Listed by Hull Number "SP" #s and "ID" #s -- World War I Era Patrol Vessels and other Acquired Ships and Craft numbered from SP-3200 through SP-3299
NavSource Online: Section Patrol Craft Photo Archive Lagoda (SP 3250)
"Lagoda", Naval History & Heritage Command, Dictionary of American Naval Fighting Ships - Lagoda https://www.history.navy.mil/content/history/nhhc/research/histories/ship-histories/danfs/l/lagoda.html

Patrol vessels of the United States Navy
World War I patrol vessels of the United States
Ships built in Morris Heights, Bronx
1906 ships
Ships built by the New York Yacht, Launch & Engine Company